The Elijah Cutler Behunin Cabin was built to house Elijah Cutler Behunin's family in 1883–84 in what is now Capitol Reef National Park in Wayne County, Utah, United States.

Description
The Behunins lived there for only a year, leaving for Fruita after a flood threatened the house and its fields. Elijah and his wife and their 13 children all lived within the home. The walls are sandstone covered with a plaster-cement wash. The roof structure is wood, covered with wood sheathing and bentonite clay. The cabin was renovated in the 1960s by the National Park Service and represents the most intact example of a settler cabin in Capitol Reef National Park.

The Behunin cabin was listed on the National Register of Historic Places on September 13, 1999.

See also

 National Register of Historic Places listings in Capitol Reef National Park
 National Register of Historic Places listings in Wayne County, Utah

References

External links

Houses in Wayne County, Utah
National Register of Historic Places in Capitol Reef National Park
Houses completed in 1884
Houses on the National Register of Historic Places in Utah
National Register of Historic Places in Wayne County, Utah